The Democratic Party of Illinois is the affiliate of the Democratic Party in the U.S. state of Illinois. It is the oldest extant state party in Illinois and one of just two recognized parties in the state, along with the Republican Party. It is currently the dominant party in the state, controlling the majority of Illinois' U.S. House seats, both U.S. Senate seats, both houses of the state legislature, and the governorship.

History

The Democratic Party of Illinois took shape during the late 1830s. Prior to that time, Illinois did not have organized political parties; instead, political competition in the state was more personalist, with prominent factions centered on Governors Ninian Edwards and Shadrach Bond. As the Democratic and Whig parties began to form at the national level during the late 1820s and 1830s, Illinois politicians began sorting themselves accordingly and, in the summer of 1837, leading Democrats met to lay the groundwork for a Democratic Party organization in the state.

Before 2010, the party had been extremely successful in statewide elections for the past decade. In 1992, Carol Moseley Braun became the first African American woman to be elected to the United States Senate. Her election marked the first time Illinois had elected a woman, and the first time a Black person was elected as a Democratic Party candidate to the United States Senate. A second African American Democratic Senator, Barack Obama was elected in 2004 (the same seat that Senator Moseley-Braun once held), and later elected President of the United States in 2008. Democrats currently hold supermajorities in both the Illinois Senate and Illinois House of Representatives.

Organization and leadership
The Democratic Party of Illinois is run by a Democratic State Central Committee of 38 members, two from each of the state's 19 congressional districts. The Central Committee has four officers: a chairman, a vice-chair, a secretary, and a treasurer.

Calvin Sutker of Skokie served as state party chairman until 1986 when he lost his committeeman seat to reform Democrat Jeffrey Paul Smith. Sutker was succeeded by Vince Demuzio, who served from 1986 to 1990 and is credited with rebuilding the Illinois Democratic Party. Demuzio was then defeated by Gary LaPaille, then-chief of staff for Illinois House Speaker Michael Madigan. Madigan himself succeeded LaPaille, serving in the role until he stepped down in 2021. He was succeeded by U.S. Representative Robin Kelly. In 2022, Kelly was replaced by State Representative Lisa Hernandez.

Cook County Democratic Party
The Cook County Democratic Party represents voters in 50 wards in the city of Chicago and 30 suburban townships of Cook County. It relies on a organizational structure of ward and township committeemen to elect candidates.

Current elected officials

Members of Congress

U.S. Senate
Democrats have controlled both of Illinois's seats in the U.S. Senate since 2016:

U.S. House of Representatives
Out of the 17 seats Illinois is apportioned in the U.S. House of Representatives, 14 are held by Democrats:

Statewide officials
Democrats control all six of the elected statewide offices:

State legislative leaders
 President of the Illinois Senate: Don Harmon
Senate Majority Leader: Kimberly A. Lightford
Assistant Senate  Majority Leader/President Pro Tempore: Bill Cunningham
Deputy Senate  Majority Leader: Laura Murphy
Assistant Senate Majority Leaders: Linda Holmes, Dave Koehler, Iris Martinez, and Antonio Munoz.
Senate Majority Caucus Chair: Mattie Hunter
Deputy Senate Majority Caucus Chair: Jacqueline Y. Collins
Majority Caucus Whips: Omar Aquino, Michael Hastings, Napoleon Harris III, and Laura Fine.
 Speaker of the House: Emanuel “Chris” Welch
House Majority Leader: Greg Harris
Deputy House Majority Leaders: Jehan Gordon-Booth, and Art Turner.
Assistant House Majority Leaders: Kelly M. Burke, Fred Crespo, Will Davis, Elizabeth Hernandez, Jay Hoffman, and Natalie Manley.
House Majority Conference Chairperson: Kathleen Willis

Mayors
 Chicago: Lori Lightfoot (1)
 Rockford: Tom McNamara (5)
 Springfield: Jim Langfelder (7)
 Peoria: Rita Ali (8)

See also

 Illinois Republican Party
 Political party strength in Illinois

References

External links
Democratic Party of Illinois

 
Illinois
Political parties in Illinois